Kevin Duncan McKenzie (born 22 January 1968, Stirling, Scotland) is a former Scotland international rugby union player.

Rugby Union career

Amateur career

McKenzie played as a hooker.

He played for Stirling County.

Provincial and professional career

He played for Glasgow District when rugby union was an amateur game.

When rugby union was professionalised, McKenzie played for Caledonia Reds.

The Reds were disbanded in 1998, and McKenzie then played for Glasgow Warriors. He made his competitive debut for the professional Glasgow district on 13 September 1998, against Edinburgh Rugby at Easter Road in the Scottish Inter-District Championship. He became Glasgow Warrior No. 43.

International career

He was capped once for Scotland 'B' on 9 December 1989 against Ireland 'B'.

He was capped fourteen times for Scotland between 1994 and 1998, including the 1995 Rugby World Cup,

His only international try was at Lansdowne Road against  on 20 January 1996.

Family

His brother Mark McKenzie also played for Glasgow District, Stirling County, Caledonia Reds and Glasgow Warriors.

References

1968 births
Living people
Scottish rugby union players
Scotland international rugby union players
Rugby union players from Stirling
Caledonia Reds players
Glasgow Warriors players
Glasgow District (rugby union) players
Stirling County RFC players
Scotland 'B' international rugby union players
Rugby union hookers